Noelle Quinn (born January 3, 1985) is a basketball coach and former player who is currently the head coach for the Seattle Storm of the Women's National Basketball Association (WNBA). As a player, Quinn played for many WNBA teams and for Botaş SK of the Turkish Women's Basketball League.

High school
Born in Los Angeles, California, Quinn played for Bishop Montgomery High School in Torrance, California, where she was named a WBCA All-American. She participated in the 2003 WBCA High School All-America Game where she scored eleven points. She led the Lady Knights to four California state championships, three regional championships, and three division championships.

College career
Quinn attended college at UCLA and graduated in 2007. Following her collegiate career, she was selected 4th overall in the 2007 WNBA Draft by the Minnesota Lynx.

College statistics
Source

Professional career
Quinn was drafted by the Minnesota Lynx in the first round of the 2007 WNBA draft. As a rookie she got off to a slow start before stepping into the point guard role when Lindsey Harding was injured in July, 2007.  Quinn finished strong, setting a franchise record with 14 assists on August 19, the season finale. She finished the season averaging 2.8 points and 4.4 assists per game. Her 148 assists for the 2007 season, tied a club record that was held by Teresa Edwards.

During a 12-year WNBA career, Quinn played for the Minnesota Lynx, Los Angeles Sparks, Washington Mystics, Phoenix Mercury, and Seattle Storm. She was a 6'0" combo guard who averaged 4.8 points per game and 2.3 assists per game for her career. In 2018, she won a WNBA championship with the Seattle Storm.

WNBA career statistics

Regular season

|-
| align="left" | 2007
| align="left" | Minnesota
| 34 || 19 || 19.7 || .298 || .184 || .625 || 2.6 || 4.4 || 0.9 || 0.4 || 2.0 || 2.8
|-
| align="left" | 2008
| align="left" | Minnesota
| 32 || 25 || 16.7 || .398 || .313 || .667 || 2.2 || 2.5 || 0.7 || 0.1 || 1.4 || 3.6
|-
| align="left" | 2009
| align="left" | Los Angeles
| 34 || 9 || 27.3 || .471 || .312 || .811 || 3.6 || 3.5 || 1.2 || 0.3 || 1.5 || 8.4
|-
| align="left" | 2010
| align="left" | Los Angeles
| 34 || 34 || 32.5 || .443 || .402 || .776 || 4.0 || 2.8 || 1.0 || 0.3 || 1.4 || 10.2
|-
| align="left" | 2011
| align="left" | Los Angeles
| 33 || 23 || 20.6 || .390 || .397 || .818 || 1.8 || 2.0 || 0.6 || 0.1 || 0.7 || 5.1
|-
| align="left" | 2012
| align="left" | Washington
| 30 || 18 || 22.2 || .396 || .403 || .731 || 2.9 || 1.8 || 0.7 || 0.2 || 1.0 || 6.5
|-
| align="left" | 2013
| align="left" | Seattle
| 34 || 15 || 25.6 || .354 || .232 || .842 || 4.9 || 1.6 || 0.8 || 0.2 || 1.2 || 5.4
|-
| align="left" | 2014
| align="left" | Seattle
| 32 || 5 || 15.1 || .380 || .258 || .880 || 2.5 || 1.3 || 0.5 || 0.1 || 0.6 || 3.8
|-
| align="left" | 2015
| align="left" | Phoenix
| 34 || 1 || 18.6 || .422 || .324 || .792 || 2.6 || 1.9 || 0.4 || 0.3 || 0.9 || 4.1
|-
| align="left" | 2016
| align="left" | Phoenix
| 13 || 0 || 9.9 || .241 || .100 || .857 || 0.9 || 1.4 || 0.4 || 0.2 || 0.8 || 1.6
|-
| align="left" | 2016
| align="left" | Seattle
| 20 || 0 || 13.9 || .288 || .083 || 1.000 || 1.8 || 1.6 || 0.5 || 0.1 || 1.0 || 1.8
|-
| align="left" | 2017
| align="left" | Seattle
| 32 || 4 || 15.8 || .403 || .385 || .952 || 1.6 || 2.8 || 0.4 || 0.2 || 0.9 || 2.7
|-
|style="text-align:left;background:#afe6ba;"| 2018†
| align="left" | Seattle
| 20 || 1 || 9.1 || .302 || .235 || .000 || 0.9 || 0.8 || 0.1 || 0.1 || 0.5 || 1.5
|-
| align="left" | Career
| align="left" | 12 years, 5 teams
| 382 || 154 || 20.1 || .396 || .322 || .797 || 2.6 || 2.3 || 0.7 || 0.2 || 1.1 || 4.8

Playoffs

|-
| align="left" | 2009
| align="left" | Los Angeles
| 6 || 4 || 26.3 || .263 || .100 || 1.000 || 3.2 || 3.8 || 1.2 || 0.5 || 3.2 || 4.8
|-
| align="left" | 2010
| align="left" | Los Angeles
| 2 || 2 || 34.0 || .368 || .500 || 1.000 || 4.0 || 0.5 || 1.0 || 0.0 || 1.5 || 9.5
|-
| align="left" | 2013
| align="left" | Seattle
| 2 || 0 || 26.5 || .429 || .333 || .000 || 3.5 || 1.5 || 0.5 || 0.0 || 0.5 || 3.5
|-
| align="left" | 2015
| align="left" | Phoenix
| 4 || 0 || 20.3 || .778 || 1.000 || .000 || 2.8 || 0.8 || 0.5 || 0.3 || 0.8 || 4.3
|-
| align="left" | 2016
| align="left" | Seattle
| 1 || 0 || 11.0 || .333 || .000 || .000 || 4.0 || 0.0 || 0.0 || 0.0 || 0.0 || 2.0
|-
| align="left" | 2017
| align="left" | Seattle
| 1 || 0 || 12.0 || 1.000 || .000 || .000 || 3.0 || 3.0 || 0.0 || 0.0 || 1.0 || 2.0
|-
|style="text-align:left;background:#afe6ba;"| 2018†
| align="left" | Seattle
| 2 || 0 || 4.0 || .000 || .000 || .000 || 0.5 || 0.0 || 0.0 || 0.0 || 0.0 || 0.0
|-
| align="left" | Career
| align="left" | 7 years, 3 teams
| 18 || 6 || 21.7 || .372 || .348 || 1.000 || 2.9 || 1.8 || 0.7 || 0.2 || 1.5 || 4.2

International career
Quinn became a naturalized Bulgarian citizen in 2007 and played with the Bulgaria women's national basketball team.

Coaching career
Beginning in 2016, Quinn coached the girls basketball team at her high school alma mater, Bishop Montgomery High School, for four seasons. In her first season, the Lady Knights won a California Interscholastic Federation (CIF) Southern Section championship.

In February 2019, after retiring from the WNBA, Quinn was hired as an assistant coach by her last team, the Seattle Storm.

For the 2020 season, Storm head coach Dan Hughes was forced to sit out the season for medical reasons. Gary Kloppenburg became head coach for the season, and Quinn was promoted to associate head coach, where she concentrated on the offense, while Kloppenburg focused on the defense. Seattle won the 2020 WNBA championship.

On May 30, 2021, Quinn was named Storm head coach upon Hughes' retirement from the WNBA.

January 2022 Quinn joined Canada Basketball as the  lead assist coach for the Canadian women’s national basketball team.

Coaching record

WNBA

|-
| align="left" | SEA
| align="left" |2021
| 26 || 16 || 10 ||  || align="center" | 3rd in West || 1 || 0 || 1 || 
| align="center" | Lost in Second Round
|-
| align="left" | SEA
| align="left" |2022
| 36 || 22 || 14 ||  || align="center" | 2nd in West || 6 || 3 || 3 || 
| align="center" | Lost in Conf. Semi-Finals
|-class="sortbottom"
| align="left" |Career
| || 62 || 38 || 24 ||  || || 7 || 3 || 4 ||

Personal
On September 23, 2009, Quinn returned to her college basketball court at Pauley Pavilion to play game one of the WNBA Conference Finals between Phoenix Mercury and her Los Angeles Sparks, which the Sparks lost 94–103.

Notes

External links
WNBA player profile
WNBA prospect profile
UCLA bio

1985 births
Living people
American women's basketball players
Basketball coaches from California
Basketball players from Los Angeles
Botaş SK players
Bulgarian women's basketball players
Los Angeles Sparks players
Minnesota Lynx draft picks
Minnesota Lynx players
Parade High School All-Americans (girls' basketball)
Phoenix Mercury players
Seattle Storm coaches
Seattle Storm players
Shooting guards
UCLA Bruins women's basketball players
Washington Mystics players